The Europäische Zeitschrift für Wirtschaftsrecht (European Journal of Business Law. Revue Européenne de Droit Économique) is an academic journal which specialises in European law with a special focus on business law. It was established in 1990 and is published by C. H. Beck. The editions are released bimonthly.

External links 
 

Publications established in 1990
European law journals